Gerard Jordan is a Northern Irish actor from Belfast.

Career
He is best known for his recurring roles in the Northern Irish TV series Pulling Moves (2004) and in BBC's The Fall (2013–2014), and for his portrayal of Biter in the HBO series Game of Thrones (2012–2014). He also starred in the Irish drama film Peacefire (2008) and he played the role of Jim in Oliver Hirschbiegel's Five Minutes of Heaven (2009).

Filmography

Film

Television

References

External links 
 

21st-century male actors from Northern Ireland
Living people
Male television actors from Northern Ireland
Male film actors from Northern Ireland
Year of birth missing (living people)
Male actors from Belfast